Brownsville is a historic home located near Nassawadox, Northampton County, Virginia. It was built in 1806, and is a two-story, brick structure with a gable roof and interior end chimney.  A -story frame wing was added in 1809.  The interior features Federal style woodwork.

According to the Federal Writers' Project, a prehistoric Indian village once stood here.

Brownsville was listed on the National Register of Historic Places in 1970.

References

External links
Brownsville, State Routes 608 & 600 vicinity, Nassawadox, Northampton County, VA 13 photos, 2 data pages, and 1 photo caption page at Historic American Buildings Survey

Historic American Buildings Survey in Virginia
Houses on the National Register of Historic Places in Virginia
Houses completed in 1806
Houses in Northampton County, Virginia
National Register of Historic Places in Northampton County, Virginia
1806 establishments in Virginia